{{Infobox person
| name         = Diane Baker
| image        = Diane Baker (1969).jpg
| caption      = Guest starring in The Virginian, 1969
| birth_name   = Diane Carol Baker
| birth_date   =   
| birth_place  = Los Angeles, California, U.S.
| death_date   =
| death_place  =
| education    = Van Nuys High School.| known_for    = The Diary of Anne FrankJourney to the Center of the EarthThe PrizeMarnieMirage| occupation   = 
| years_active = 1959–present
}}

Diane Carol Baker is an American actress, producer and educator who has appeared in motion pictures and on television since 1959.

 Early life 
Baker was born in 1938 at Hollywood Presbyterian Hospital in Hollywood, Los Angeles, California and raised in North Hollywood and Studio City, California. She is the daughter of Dorothy Helen Harrington, who had appeared in several early Marx Brothers movies, and automobile salesman Clyde Lucius Baker. Baker has two younger sisters, Patricia and Cheryl. At age 18, after graduating from Van Nuys High School in 1956, Baker moved to New York to study acting with Charles Conrad and ballet with Nina Fonaroff.

 Career 

After securing a seven-year contract with 20th Century Fox in 1958, Baker made her film debut when she was chosen by director George Stevens to play Margot Frank in the 1959 motion picture The Diary of Anne Frank. In the same year, she starred in Journey to the Center of the Earth with James Mason and Pat Boone in The Best of Everything with Hope Lange and Joan Crawford.

Other Fox films in which Baker appeared include the assassination thriller Nine Hours to Rama, Hemingway's Adventures of a Young Man, and The 300 Spartans. Her television work, which began in the 1960s, includes appearances on Follow the Sun, Bus Stop, Adventures in Paradise, The Lloyd Bridges Show, The Nurses, The Invaders (in the first episode), and two episodes of Route 66.

Finally out of her contract with Fox after starring in the fourth screen version of Grace Miller White's novel Tess of the Storm Country and The 300 Spartans (1962), Baker appeared in Stolen Hours, a 1963 remake of Dark Victory (Mirisch Corp. and United Artists), and, the same year, opposite Paul Newman and Elke Sommer in The Prize (MGM). From 1963 to 1966, Baker had a recurring role on the medical drama Dr. Kildare.

In 1964, she co-starred with Joan Crawford in both Strait-Jacket, William Castle's thriller about an axe murderess, and an unsold television pilot Royal Bay, released to theaters as Della. Alfred Hitchcock cast her in his film Marnie (1964) as Lil Mainwaring, the sister-in-law of Mark Rutland (Sean Connery). She co-starred with Gregory Peck and Walter Matthau in the thriller Mirage (1965), directed by Edward Dmytryk, and in Krakatoa, East of Java (1969) with Maximilian Schell. In the TV movie Western The Dangerous Days of Kiowa Jones (1966), she played the role of a woman who falls in love with a drifter (Robert Horton) who is deputized by a dying marshal to take two killers (one of whom is played by Sal Mineo) to a distant jail.

In August 1967, Baker played David Janssen's love interest in the two-part finale of The Fugitive, which became the most-watched show in the history of episodic television up until that time. In 1968, she co-starred with Dean Jones in the Disney film The Horse in the Gray Flannel Suit. In January 1970, she had the lead guest-starring female role as Princess Francesca in the only three-episode mission of Mission: Impossible. In 1973, Baker co-starred in ABC sitcom Here We Go Again. The series was canceled after one season. In 1976, she played the frequently drunken daughter of the title character of the Columbo episode "Last Salute to the Commodore".

In the decades after Mirage, she appeared frequently on television and began producing films, including the drama film Never Never Land (1980) and the miniseries A Woman of Substance (1984), in which she played Laura. She reemerged on the big screen in The Silence of the Lambs (1991) as Senator Ruth Martin. Baker also appeared in the films The Joy Luck Club, The Cable Guy, The Net and A Mighty Wind. She guest-starred in four episodes of House'' in 2005, 2008, and twice in 2012 as Blythe House, the mother of the title character.

Baker spent more than a decade teaching acting at the Academy of Art University in San Francisco. She was formerly the executive director of the School of Motion Pictures-Television and the School of Acting.

Personal life 
Baker has dated Warren Beatty, Gardner McKay, Frank Langella, Michael Lerner and John Saxon.

Selected TV and filmography

Awards and nominations

Golden Globe Awards

Primetime Emmy Award

Daytime Emmy Award

References

External links 

 
 
 
 

20th-century American actresses
21st-century American actresses
20th Century Studios contract players
Academy of Art University faculty
Actresses from Los Angeles
American film actresses
American television actresses
American women film producers
Film producers from California
Living people
Van Nuys High School alumni
1938 births